The Anadarko Daily News is the largest daily paper of Caddo County, Oklahoma and traces its heritage back to 1901. The paper is family-owned and its editor is Carolyn McBride. The paper was a merger of three papers purchased by Joe McBride Sr. in 1937. Its offices were destroyed by a fire in August 2009 and were earlier damaged by a tornado.

References

Caddo County, Oklahoma
Newspapers established in 1937
Newspapers published in Oklahoma